Mark Andrew Grant (born October 24, 1963), nicknamed Mud, is an American former professional starting pitcher and is the current color commentator for the San Diego Padres' television broadcasts.

Career
Grant was a first-round pick by the San Francisco Giants in the 1981 Major League Baseball draft. Grant played for the Giants from  through , when he was traded to the San Diego Padres. Grant played for the Padres through  where he was again dealt to the Atlanta Braves for Derek Lilliquist. In , he signed to the Houston Astros. The same season on May 20, he was sent to the expansion team Colorado Rockies for Braulio Castillo. He was released from the club just two months later, and signed with the California Angels on August 20. 

In 1994, he took a break from baseball to host a talk radio show for KFMB-AM along with broadcasting Padres games for the station. Grant returned to baseball in  when he pitched for the Chicago Cubs AAA affiliate Iowa. In  he briefly played for CPBL's Uni-President Lions and officially retired from baseball after leaving the Lions.

Broadcasting
In 1996, Grant began working in the Padres' TV broadcast booth for Prime Sports Network. In 1997, Mark began his 15 year run with Channel 4 San Diego, teaming with a variety of partners including Mel Proctor and Matt Vasgersian. In 2012, he moved to the new regional television network Fox Sports San Diego, where he continued to provide color commentary with famed play-by-play announcer Dick Enberg until the latter's retirement after the 2016 season. His current main colleague is Don Orsillo. Grant's style of color commentary along with his humorous on-air antics have made "Mud" (a nickname given early in his playing career by Giants coach Danny Ozark in reference to Mudcat Grant) a favorite with Padres fans.

Personal life
Grant currently resides in Alpine, California, with his wife Mary, two sons, and a daughter.  In 2007, Mark Grant was honored by the Kiwanis Club of Alpine, for his contributions to the community.   He is also a frequent contributor to sports talk shows on XX Sports Radio in San Diego, as well as the Dave, Shelly, and Chainsaw show on 101.5 KGB FM.

References

External links

 Mark Grant Bio

1963 births
Living people
American expatriate baseball players in Canada
American expatriate baseball players in Taiwan
American television sports announcers
Atlanta Braves players
Baseball players from Illinois
Calgary Cannons players
Colorado Rockies players
Houston Astros players
Iowa Cubs players
Jacksonville Suns players
Major League Baseball broadcasters
Major League Baseball pitchers
People from Alpine, California
Richmond Braves players
San Francisco Giants players
San Diego Padres announcers
San Diego Padres players
Seattle Mariners players
Sportspeople from Joliet, Illinois
Tucson Toros players
Uni-President Lions players
Vancouver Canadians players